In geometry, a square pyramid is a pyramid having a square base. If the apex is perpendicularly above the center of the square, it is a right square pyramid, and has  symmetry. If all edge lengths are equal, it is an equilateral square pyramid, the Johnson solid

General square pyramid 
A possibly oblique square pyramid with base length l and perpendicular height h has volume:
.

Right square pyramid 
In a right square pyramid, all the lateral edges have the same length, and the sides other than the base are congruent isosceles triangles.

A right square pyramid with base length l and height h has surface area and volume:
,
.

The lateral edge length is:
;
the slant height is:
.

The dihedral angles are:
between the base and a side:
;
between two sides:
.

Equilateral square pyramid, Johnson solid J1  
If all edges have the same length, then the sides are equilateral triangles, and the pyramid is an equilateral square pyramid, Johnson solid J1.

The Johnson square pyramid can be characterized by a single edge length parameter l.

The height h (from the midpoint of the square to the apex), the surface area A (including all five faces), and the volume V of an equilateral square pyramid are:
 ,
,
.

The dihedral angles of an equilateral square pyramid are:
between the base and a side:
.
between two (adjacent) sides:
.

Graph 
A square pyramid can be represented by the wheel graph W5.

Related polyhedra and honeycombs 

Square pyramids fill space with tetrahedra, truncated cubes, or cuboctahedra.

Dual polyhedron 
The square pyramid is topologically a self-dual polyhedron. The dual's edge lengths are different due to the polar reciprocation.

References

External links
 
 
 Square Pyramid -- Interactive Polyhedron Model
Virtual Reality Polyhedra georgehart.com: The Encyclopedia of Polyhedra (VRML model)

Johnson solids
Prismatoid polyhedra
Pyramids and bipyramids
Self-dual polyhedra